Lin Yung-lo (born 10 March 1950), also known as David Lin, is a Taiwanese politician who was the Minister of Foreign Affairs of Taiwan. In 2022, he was elected as the Chairman of the Association of Foreign Relations (AFR).

Early life

David Lin graduated with a bachelor and master of commerce degree from the National Chengchi University in Taiwan. He earned his Master of Science degree from Georgetown University in the United States.

He was also a member of the Taipei Toastmasters club.

ROC Foreign Ministry

Minister of Foreign Affairs appointment

Lin was appointed to be the Minister of Foreign Affairs of the Republic of China on 27 September 2012 replacing the incumbent Minister Timothy Yang after the ROC cabinet reshuffle.

ROC delegates refusal from Jakarta International Defense Dialogue

Commenting on the refusal for ROC delegates to attend the Jakarta International Defense Dialogue in Jakarta, Indonesia on 23–25 March 2013 by the event organizer, Lin said that the MOFA needed to communicate with the Indonesian counterpart on the exact reason for the sudden withdrawal of the invitation to the Taiwanese. Lin acknowledged that this may due to verbal protest from Beijing.

ROC-Japan fishery agreement signing

After the historic signing on fishery agreement between ROC and Japan on 10 April 2013, at a press conference Lin said that the agreement didn't address the competing claims over the Diaoyutai Islands since both governments set aside the dispute at the moment.

Taiwanese fisherman shooting incident
After the shooting incident of Taiwanese fisherman by Philippine government vessel on 9 May 2013 at the disputed water in South China Sea, Lin demanded the Philippine government to take full responsibility, offer formal apology to the ROC government, provide compensation to the family of the fisherman shot and bring those responsible to justice. Lin added that the government understood that the Taiwanese fishing vessel was not involved in illegal fishing prior to the shooting. He pledged that the ROC government would work to discover the truth behind this incident. He slammed the Philippine government because the incident was a violation of international law because it left the Taiwanese vessel without power.

On May 11, 2013, Lin held a meeting with ROC President Ma Ying-jeou and ROC Minister of Defense Kao Hua-chu at the Presidential Office Building in Taipei in which the ROC government gave 72 hours for the Philippine government to give formal apology and bring those responsible for the shooting to justice, if not Taiwan will freeze Philippine worker applications, recall ROC representative to the Philippines back to Taiwan and ask the Philippine representative in Taiwan back to the Philippines.

Mainland China trade mission establishment in São Tomé and Príncipe
Commenting on the establishment of Mainland China trade mission office in São Tomé and Príncipe in November 2013, Lin said that the decision is unlikely to affect the diplomatic relations between ROC and São Tomé and Príncipe since both side established diplomatic relations on 6 May 1997, but MOFA will review its existing assistance program to the African country and make any adjustment if necessary.

Representative to the United Kingdom
Lin was appointed as Taiwan's representative to the United Kingdom, a post then held by Liu Chih-kung, shortly after stepping down as foreign minister. He retired from the position in June 2020, and was succeeded by Kelly Hsieh.

References

1950 births
Living people
Taiwanese Ministers of Foreign Affairs
Representatives of Taiwan to the European Union
Ambassadors of the Republic of China
National Chengchi University alumni
Georgetown University alumni
Recipients of the Order of Brilliant Star
Representatives of Taiwan to Indonesia
Representatives of Taiwan to Belgium